Lemon Heights may refer to:

 Lemon Heights, California (also called North Tustin)
 Lemon Heights, Palau, a village in Palau